James Rooke ( – 4 October 1805) was an English general in the British Army and a politician.

Early life

He was the only son of Major James Rooke and his wife, Jane, daughter and heiress of Tracy Catchmay of Bigsweir House, Monmouthshire. He inherited large estates in Monmouthshire from his mother.

Career
Rooke joined the army in 1759, and by 1779 was a Lieutenant-Colonel of the 14th Foot. He was promoted colonel in 1780, major-general in 1787 and served as colonel commandant of the 4th Battalion, 60th (Royal American) Regiment of Foot from 1788 to 1796.

in 1796 he was given the colonelcy of the 38th (1st Staffordshire) Regiment of Foot for life and promoted full General in 1802.

He was a Member of Parliament (MP) for Monmouthshire from 1785 until his death.

Personal life and death

Rooke had married Elizabeth Brown of St Briavels. Their son, Lieutenant-Colonel James Rooke, died of his wounds in Colombia fighting for independence in 1819. Their daughter, Eleanor, married Thomas Probyn, Governor of St Kitts.

Rooke died at age 63 and was buried in St Briavels, Gloucestershire in 1805.

References 
 

|-

1742 births
1805 deaths
British Army generals
Members of the Parliament of Great Britain for Welsh constituencies
British MPs 1784–1790
British MPs 1790–1796
British MPs 1796–1800
Members of the Parliament of the United Kingdom for Welsh constituencies
UK MPs 1801–1802
UK MPs 1802–1806
West Yorkshire Regiment officers